Hoàng Văn Bình (born 1 February 1989) is a former Vietnamese footballer who played as a midfielder for V-League club Sông Lam Nghệ An and the Vietnam national football team.

References 

1989 births
Living people
Vietnamese footballers
Association football midfielders
V.League 1 players
Song Lam Nghe An FC players
Becamex Binh Duong FC players
Thanh Hóa FC players
People from Nghệ An province
Vietnam international footballers